Qasemabad (also Romanized as Qāsemābād) is a village in Rivand Rural District, in the Central District of Nishapur County, Razavi Khorasan Province, Iran. At the 2006 census, its population was 27, in 7 families.

References 

Populated places in Nishapur County